Foreign relations exist between Armenia and Bulgaria. Both countries have had diplomatic relations since they were established in 1992. Armenia has an embassy in Sofia; since December 19, 1999, Bulgaria has an embassy in Yerevan.  Both countries are full members of the Organization of the Black Sea Economic Cooperation.

History 

The first Armenians in Bulgarian history were mentioned during the golden age of the First Bulgarian Empire, but it became important when one of the most famous person in Bulgarian history, Samuel of Bulgaria, was half-Armenian. Because of this link, this had become an effect for the opening of one of the oldest friendship in the world: the Armenian-Bulgarian friendship.

All three Presidents of Armenia have made official visits to Bulgaria and reciprocal visits have also been made by Bulgarian Presidents and Prime Ministers. Armenia exports mainly chemicals, scrap metal and raw materials to Bulgaria, while Bulgaria exports mainly minerals, processed food, rubber and raw materials to Armenia. The Bulgarian coastal city of Varna is a popular tourist destination for Armenian Citizens.

In 2015, Bulgaria officially recognized the Armenian genocide.

Armenian diaspora in Bulgaria

Armenians are the fourth largest minority in Bulgaria, numbering 6,552 according to the 2011 census.

There are currently around 30,000 people of Armenian descent living in Bulgaria.

Diplomacy

Armenia
Sofia (Embassy)

Bulgaria
Yerevan (Embassy)

See also 
 Foreign relations of Armenia
 Foreign relations of Bulgaria 
 Armenians in Bulgaria
 Armenia–European Union relations
 Armenian genocide recognition

References

External links 
  Bulgarian embassy in Yerevan
 http://bulgaria.mfa.am/en/ambassador/
 https://web.archive.org/web/20141229085954/http://www.mfa.am/en/country-by-country/bg/

 

 
Bulgaria 
Bilateral relations of Bulgaria